Bud Alper (August 24, 1930 – December 19, 2012) was an American sound engineer. He was nominated for two Academy Awards in the category Best Sound.

Selected filmography
 Rocky (1976)
 Ladyhawke (1985)

References

External links

1930 births
2012 deaths
American audio engineers
Place of birth missing